Robert Michael Rosario (born 4 March 1966) is an English football coach and former professional player.

As a player, he was a forward who notably played in the top flight of English football for Norwich City, Coventry City and Nottingham Forest, with appearances in the Premier League for both the Sky Blues and The Reds. He also played for Wolverhampton Wanderers and later finished his career in the United States with Greensboro Dynamo, Carolina Dynamo and Charleston Battery.

Playing career
Rosario started his career in non-league football, joining Hillingdon Borough from Harrow Borough in August 1983 at the age of 17. Five goals in nine Southern League starts alerted scouts and in December 1983, he joined Norwich City. He made 161 appearances in six seasons and scored just 29 goals.

Rosario signed for Coventry City for £600,000 by Terry Butcher in April 1991 he was seen to be the successor to Cyrille Regis.

It was in his second season after the arrival of a new manager, Bobby Gould and a new striker, Micky Quinn, that Rosario began to feature more, providing many chances for Quinn who notched 17 goals in 26 games in the 1992–93 season. In March 1993, with City's financial situation worsening he was sold to Nottingham Forest for £450,000. His last appearance for Forest came in April 1994, as injuries took hold, and although he was fully fit for the 1995–96 season, he was no longer part of Clark's plans at the City Ground and left at the end of the season, signalling the end of his playing career by the age of 30.

After his move to Forest he struggled to win a regular place and suffered a serious knee injury which eventually forced his retirement from the professional game in England.

In February 1997, he joined the Carolina Dynamos of the USA's Second Division, the A-League, for whom he made 29 appearances, scoring four goals. In April 1998, he joined another A League side, the Charleston Battery from South Carolina.

Coaching career
Rosario had a spell in charge of Carolina Dynamo in 2001.

Personal life
Rosario resides in North Carolina, where he has coached at the North Meck Soccer club.

His son Gabriel, is a former Reading and Huddersfield Town youth team goalkeeper.

References

External links
Link to article in Norwich sports paper re Rosario's career
Career information at ex-canaries.co.uk

Sources

1966 births
Living people
English footballers
Harrow Borough F.C. players
Norwich City F.C. players
Wolverhampton Wanderers F.C. players
Coventry City F.C. players
Nottingham Forest F.C. players
Charleston Battery players
North Carolina Fusion U23 players
England under-21 international footballers
English people of Italian descent
Association football forwards
Premier League players
Footballers from Greater London
English expatriate sportspeople in the United States
Expatriate soccer players in the United States
English expatriate footballers